The Distinguished Service Medal (DSM) was a military decoration awarded until 1993 to personnel of the Royal Navy and members of the other services, and formerly to personnel of other Commonwealth countries, up to and including the rank of Chief Petty Officer, for bravery and resourcefulness on active service at sea.

History
The medal was established on 14 October 1914 as the third level decoration for gallantry in action for ratings of the Royal Navy, not at the standard required to receive the Victoria Cross or the Conspicuous Gallantry Medal. The equivalent decoration for Officers and Warrant Officers was the Distinguished Service Cross (DSC). The DSM ranked below the DSC in order of precedence, between the George Medal and the Military Medal after those medals were established in 1940 and 1916 respectively. Awards of the DSM were announced in the London Gazette. Recipients are entitled to use the post-nominal letters "DSM".

The DSM was intended to reward bravery at sea. For example, members of the Royal Naval Division, who served alongside the Army in France in the First World War, were eligible for Army decorations, including the Distinguished Conduct Medal and the Military Medal.

From 1916, ribbon bars could be authorised for subsequent awards of the DSM.

In 1940 the award was extended to Royal Air Force personnel serving with the Fleet and, in 1942, to members of the Merchant Navy, and Army personnel serving afloat, for example manning a merchant ship's anti-aircraft guns.

In 1979 eligibility for a number of awards, including the DSM, was extended to permit posthumous awards. Until that time, only the Victoria Cross and a mention in dispatches could be awarded posthumously.

The Distinguished Service Medal was discontinued in 1993, as part of the review of the British honours system which recommended removing distinctions of rank in respect of awards for bravery. Since then the Distinguished Service Cross, previously only open to Commissioned and Warrant Officers, has been awarded to all ranks.

The DSM had also been awarded by Commonwealth countries but by the 1990s most, including Canada, Australia and New Zealand, were establishing their own honours systems and no longer recommended British honours.

Description
 The DSM is a circular silver medal,  in diameter, with the following design:
 The obverse bears the effigy and titles of the reigning monarch.
 The reverse has the inscription 'FOR DISTINGUISHED SERVICE' on three lines, within a laurel wreath surmounted by an Imperial crown.
 The suspender is plain and straight.
 The name, rank, service number and ship of the recipient are engraved or impressed on the rim of the medal.
 The ribbon is 32 millimetres (1.25 inches) wide and consists of three equal stripes: dark blue, white, and dark blue, with a thin dark blue stripe down the centre of the white.
 Ribbon bars, indicating a further award, are silver and ornamented with laurel leaves. Bars issued during the First World War were dated on the reverse, while those awarded during the Second World War were undated. When the ribbon alone is worn, a silver rosette denotes the award of each bar.

Obverse variations
The medal was awarded with one of five obverse designs:

Numbers of awards
Between 1914 and 1993, approximately 11,311 medals and 227 bars were awarded. 

These figures include honorary awards made to servicemen from allied countries during both World Wars.

See also
 British and Commonwealth orders and decorations 
 Australian Honours Order of Precedence

Notes and citations 
Notes

Citations

Bibliography

 
 
 
 

Military awards and decorations of the United Kingdom